Sparganothis praecana is a species of moth of the family Tortricidae. It is found in Austria, Norway, Sweden, Finland and Russia. It is also found in North America, where it has been reported from Colorado, the Northwest Territory and the Yukon Territory.

The wingspan is 20–28 mm. Adults are on wing in June and July in northern Europe.

The larvae feed on Betula pendula, Vaccinium corymbosum and Rhododendron species.

Subspecies
Sparganothis praecana praecana
Sparganothis praecana habeleri Lichtenberger, 1997 (Austrian Alps)

References

Moths described in 1900
Sparganothis
Moths of Europe